"Born 2 B.R.E.E.D." is a song by British rapper, actress and radio personality Monie Love. It was written by Love with Prince and Levi Seacer Jr., and released in February 1993 as the second single from her second album, In a Word or 2 (1993). B.R.E.E.D. is an acronym for "Build Relationships where Education and Enlightenment Dominate". A remix produced by Steve "Silk" Hurley was also included on the album. In Love's native UK, the single went to #18, as well as charting on the Dutch and German music charts. On the US charts, it only peaked at #56 on the soul chart and #89 on the Hot 100. On the US dance chart, "Born 2 B.R.E.E.D." was Monie Love's most successful of four releases, reaching #1 for one week. In Australia, it peaked at #98 on the ARIA singles chart in May 1993.

Critical reception
Pan-European magazine Music & Media wrote, "Add a female rap to the classic Chic sound of the '70s, and you got it. We love it. Period." Andy Beevers from Music Week gave the song four out of five and named it Pick of the Week in the category of Dance, noting that it is co-written and produced by Prince. He added, "Her catchy rap, based around her new status as a mother, is set against a ragga-style chorus and comes in a variety of strong mixes. Already picking up plenty of radio and club play, it is shaping up to be a pretty big hit." Parry Gettelman from Orlando Sentinel said, "The combination of a slinky beat and disco-style strings and backing vocals works nicely, and funk-dancehall passages enliven things further. However, the song delivers a rather clouded message."

Charts

Weekly charts

Year-end charts

See also
 List of number-one dance singles of 1993 (U.S.)

References

1993 singles
Monie Love songs
Songs written by Prince (musician)
1993 songs